Blumea is a genus of flowering plants of the family Asteraceae.

Characteristics
Genus Blumea is found in the tropical and sub-tropical zones of Asia, especially the Indian Subcontinent and Southeast Asia. A few species are found in Australia and still fewer in Africa.

The plants of this genus are mostly relatively small weeds. Some of them are ruderal species.

A few of the species were formerly included in genus Conyza.

Many species of genus Blumea are used in traditional Chinese medicine. Other uses include as decorative dry plants.

Blumea balsamifera (Nat; หนาด) is reputed to ward off spirits in Thai folklore, and is used in Philippines herbal medicine as well.

Blumea axillaris (syn. Blumea mollis) leaf essential oil contains linalool ( 19%), γ-elemene (c. 12%), copaene (c. 11%), estragole (c.11%), allo-ocimene (c. 10 %), γ-terpinene (8%) and allo-aromadendrene (c. 7 %). The essential oil had significant toxic effect against early fourth-instar larvae of Culex quinquefasciatus with LC50 = 71.71 and LC90 = 143.41 ppm.

Other uses of the name
Blumea is also the name of the Journal of Plant Taxonomy and Plant Geography published by the National Herbarium of the Netherlands.

Species
, Plants of the World Online accepted the following species:

Blumea adenophora Franch.
Blumea angustifolia Thwaites
Blumea arfakiana Martelli
Blumea arnakidophora Mattf.
Blumea aromatica DC.
Blumea axillaris (Lam.) DC.
Blumea balfourii Hemsl.
Blumea balsamifera (L.) DC.
Blumea barbata DC.
Blumea belangeriana DC.
Blumea benthamiana Domin
Blumea bicolor Merr.
Blumea bifoliata (L.) DC.
Blumea borneensis S.Moore
Blumea bovei (DC.) Vatke
Blumea braunii (Vatke) J.-P.Lebrun & Stork
Blumea bullata J.Kost.
Blumea cafra (DC.) O.Hoffm.
Blumea canalensis S.Moore
Blumea celebica Boerl.
Blumea confertiflora Merr.
Blumea conspicua Hayata
Blumea crinita Arn.
Blumea densiflora DC.
Blumea diffusa R.Br. ex Benth.
Blumea eriantha DC.
Blumea fistulosa (Roxb.) Kurz
Blumea flava DC.
Blumea formosana Kitam.
Blumea hamiltonii DC.
Blumea hieraciifolia (Spreng.) DC. - hawkweed leaf blumea (毛毡草)
Blumea hirsuta (Less.) M.R.Almeida
Blumea hossei Craib ex Hosseus
Blumea incisa Merr.
Blumea integrifolia DC.
Blumea intermedia J.Kost.
Blumea junghuhniana (Miq.) Boerl.
Blumea lacera (Burm.f.) DC. - Malay blumea, kakronda (红头草)
Blumea laevis (Lour.) Merr.
Blumea lanceolaria (Roxb.) Druce
Blumea lanceolata Warb.
Blumea linearis C.I Peng & W.P.Leu
Blumea longipes Merr.
Blumea macrostachya DC.
Blumea malcolmii Hook.f.
Blumea manillensis DC.
Blumea martiniana Vaniot
Blumea megacephala C.T.Chang & C.H.Yu
Blumea milnei Seem.
Blumea mindanaensis Merr.
Blumea moluccana Boerl.
Blumea napifolia DC.
Blumea obliqua (L.) Druce
Blumea oblongifolia Kitam.
Blumea obovata DC.
Blumea oxyodonta DC. – spiny leaved blumea
Blumea papuana S.Moore
Blumea psammophila Dunlop
Blumea pungens W.Fitzg.
Blumea ramosii Merr.
Blumea repanda (Roxb.) Hand.-Mazz.
Blumea riparia DC.
Blumea sagittata Gagnep.
Blumea saussureoides C.C.Chang & Y.Q.Tseng ex Y.Ling & Y.Q.Tseng
Blumea saxatilis Zoll. & Moritzi
Blumea scabrifolia Ridl.
Blumea sericea (Thomson) Anderb. & A.K.Pandey
Blumea sessiliflora Decne.
Blumea sikkimensis Hook.f.
Blumea sinuata (Lour.) Merr.
Blumea sonbhadrensis S.Narain, Lata & Juhi Singh
Blumea stenophylla Merr.
Blumea subalpina Lauterb.
Blumea sumbawensis Boerl.
Blumea sylvatica (Blume) DC.
Blumea tenella DC.
Blumea tenuifolia C.Y.Wu
Blumea ternatensis Boerl.
Blumea timorensis DC. ex Decne.
Blumea vanoverberghii Merr.
Blumea venkataramanii R.S.Rao & Hemadri
Blumea veronicifolia Franch.
Blumea vestita Kitam.
Blumea viminea DC.
Blumea virens DC.
Blumea zeylanica Grierson

Bibliography
 John Lindley & Thomas Moore, The treasury of botany

References

External links
 
 
 Flowers of India - Blumea paniculata
 Herbal medicine - Blumea densiflora

Inuleae
Asteraceae genera